Panopaea (minor planet designation: 70 Panopaea) is a large main belt asteroid. Its orbit is close to those of the Eunomia asteroid family; however, Panopaea is a dark, primitive carbonaceous C-type asteroid in contrast to the S-type asteroids of the Eunomian asteroids. The spectra of the asteroid displays evidence of aqueous alteration. Previous studies that suggested the rotation period may be twice this amount were rejected based upon further observation.

Panopaea was discovered by Hermann Goldschmidt on 5 May 1861. It was his fourteenth and last asteroid discovery. It is named after Panopea, a nymph in Greek mythology; the name was chosen by Robert Main, President of the Royal Astronomical Society. In 1862, Swedish astronomer Nils Christoffer Dunér gave a doctoral thesis on the orbital elements of this asteroid.

The orbit of 70 Panopaea places it in a mean motion resonance with the planets Jupiter and Saturn. The computed Lyapunov time for this asteroid is 24,000 years, indicating that it occupies a chaotic orbit that will change randomly over time because of gravitational perturbations of the planets.

The asteroid frequently makes close approaches with 16 Psyche, such as on 12 June 2040 when it will make a close approach of 0.00602 AU (2.34 Lunar distances, or approx. 770,000 km, 478,455 mi) to the asteroid, and on 2 June 2095 when it will come only 0.003372 AU (1.31 LD) to the asteroid.

References

External links 
 
 

Background asteroids
Panopaea
Panopaea
C-type asteroids (Tholen)
Ch-type asteroids (SMASS)
18610505